Varen is a commune in the Tarn-et-Garonne department in the Occitanie region in southern France. Lexos station has rail connections to Toulouse, Figeac and Aurillac.

See also
Communes of the Tarn-et-Garonne department

References

Communes of Tarn-et-Garonne